This is a list of variational topics in from mathematics and physics. See calculus of variations for a general introduction.
 Action (physics)
 Averaged Lagrangian
 Brachistochrone curve
 Calculus of variations
 Catenoid
 Cycloid
 Dirichlet principle
 Euler–Lagrange equation cf. Action (physics)
 Fermat's principle
 Functional (mathematics)
 Functional derivative
 Functional integral
 Geodesic
 Isoperimetry
 Lagrangian
 Lagrangian mechanics
 Legendre transformation
 Luke's variational principle
 Minimal surface
 Morse theory
 Noether's theorem
 Path integral formulation
 Plateau's problem
 Prime geodesic
 Principle of least action
 Soap bubble
 Soap film
 Tautochrone curve

Variations